Julie Cross is an American author of young adult fiction. She lives in central Illinois.

Cross is best known as the author of the Tempest Trilogy. The first book in the series, Tempest, was nominated for a 2012 Young Adult Fantasy/Futuristic/Science Fiction Novel Award from RT Book Reviews, and received a starred review from Kirkus Reviews

Books

Tempest Trilogy
Tempest, St. Martin's Press, 2012 
Vortex, St. Martin's Press, 2013 
Timestorm, St. Martin's Press, 2014

Letters to Nowhere Series
Letters to Nowhere, Long Walk Press, 2013
Return to Sender, Long Walk Press, 2013
Return to You, Long Walk Press, 2013
Return to Us, Long Walk Press, 2014

Other books
Third Degree, Flirt, 2014 
Whatever Life Throws at You, Entangled Teen, 2014
Fifty First Times: A New Adult Anthology, Avon, 2014

References

American writers of young adult literature
Year of birth missing (living people)
Living people